George Hall may refer to:

People

The arts
 George Hall (actor) (1916–2002), Canadian-American actor
 George Hall (musician) (c. 1893 – c. 1989), American bandleader
 George Hall (cartoonist) (born 1960), Australian comic book writer and artist
 George Lothian Hall (1825–1888), watercolour artist
 George Henry Hall (artist) (1825–1913), American still-life and landscape artist

Military and politics
 George Hall (Australian politician) (1811–1867), South Australian MLC and businessman
 George Hall (British administrator), private secretary in South Australia then governor of Parkhurst Prison
 George Hall (New York politician) (1770–1840), US congressman
 George Hall, 1st Viscount Hall (1881–1965), First Lord of the Admiralty of the UK
 George Barker Hall (1819–1858), lawyer, judge and political figure in Canada West
 George Benson Hall (1780–1821), naval officer and Upper Canada politician
 George J. Hall (1921–1946), American soldier and Medal of Honor recipient
 Sir George King-Hall (1850–1939), Royal Navy admiral and last commander of the Australia Squadron
 George R. Hall, businessman and former Federal Energy Regulatory Commission commissioner 
 George W. Hall, American mayor of Seattle in the 1890s
 George Williamson Hall (1818–1896), Member of Parliament in Christchurch, New Zealand
 George Hall (Brooklyn) (1795–1868), American mayor of Brooklyn
 George Joseph Hall (1857–1924), member of the Queensland Legislative Assembly

Religion
 George Hall (bishop of Chester) (1613–1668), English Anglican bishop
 George Hall (bishop of Dromore) (1753–1811), Irish Church of Ireland bishop

Sportspeople
 George Hall (American football) (born 1984), American football player
 George Hall (baseball) (1849–1923), British-American baseball player
 George Hall (Australian footballer) (1880–1954), Australian rules footballer
 George Hall (footballer, born 1912) (1912–1989), English footballer
 George Hall (footballer, born 2004) English footballer
 George William Hall, the birth name of Willie Hall (English footballer) (1912–1967), English footballer

Other
 Geo. Hall (1818–1881), manufacturer of soft drinks in South Australia
 George G. Hall (born 1925), English mathematician and quantum chemist
 George William Hall (1770–1843), Vice-Chancellor of Oxford University

Places
 George Hall, the residence of darts pundit Bobby George
 George Hall (Mississippi State University), named for James Z. George
 Georgievsky Hall or St. George Hall, Grand Kremlin Palace, Moscow

Hall, George
Architectural disambiguation pages